The Eberswalde trolleybus system serves the city of Eberswalde, in the Land of Brandenburg, Germany.

Opened on 3 November 1940, it is the oldest of the three remaining trolleybus systems in Germany.

See also
Eberswalde Hauptbahnhof
List of trolleybus systems in Germany

References

Books

External links

 
 

Eberswalde
Eberswalde
Eberswalde